The Whale Road is the first novel of the five-part Oathsworn series by Scottish writer of historical fiction, Robert Low, released on 1 August 2007 through Harper. The début novel was well received.

Plot
Orm Rurikson joins the crew of a Viking longship, whilst still a child. The novel follows the "Oathsworn", the brotherhood who crew the boat, as they hunt for relics, including the secret burial horde of Attila the Hun, their journeys taking them through a treacherous maritime area known as "The Whale Road".

Reception
The novel was well received by reviewers and fellow novelists alike.

New Zealand newspaper The Southland Times, stated that "Low has transported you on to a raiding ship and you almost feel like you are there. The sense of realism is engaging." although did comment that the book is, with regard to the novels graphic fight scenes, "Not one for the light-hearted.". Nilya Carrato writing for Library Journal also praised the novel, stating "this rollicking adventure has a cinematic feel that draws readers into the world of Orm and the Oathsworn and keeps them hooked.".

Fellow author of historical fiction Angus Donald was particularly effusive in his praise. He comments that it's a "fabulous, gritty saga" and that "I’m absolutely gripped. It’s violent, authentic and very exciting". Donald also praises Low's "authorial courage", referring to the deaths of two of the "best characters" early on in the course of the novel. Bill Ward, writing for Black Gate, did find that the novel "is, at times, somewhat vague in setting a scene or explaining the relationship of one of the numerous players to the somewhat convoluted plot", however follows that by stating that these are "minor and infrequent hitches on what is a fantastic ride through the world of 965 AD." Ward also praised Low's level of detail in the novel and the successful evocation of life in the Dark Ages.

References

External links
 

Category:Debut novels

2007 British novels
Novels set in the Viking Age
Scottish historical novels
Novels by Robert Low
2007 debut novels
HarperCollins books